Baptiste is a British TV drama starring Tchéky Karyo as Julien Baptiste, a character that originated in the series The Missing. The spinoff is produced by Two Brothers Pictures and distributed worldwide by their parent company All3Media. The first series, set in Amsterdam, was broadcast on BBC One starting in February 2019 and is written by Harry and Jack Williams, who also wrote The Missing. In the United States, it was broadcast by PBS on its series Masterpiece beginning on 12 April 2020. A second series, set in Budapest, began on BBC One on 18 July 2021.

Synopsis of first series
The show uses one of the central characters from the TV series, The Missing, the detective Julien Baptiste, played by Tchéky Karyo. Baptiste's wife and daughter are played by the same actors from The Missing, otherwise, all other characters and actors starring in the programme are new.

After having an operation on his brain tumour, Julien Baptiste claims he is not the man he once was. His former boss persuades him to help the Dutch Police look for a missing 15-year-old enslaved sex worker in Amsterdam. While looking, he meets Edward Stratton, the uncle of the missing girl. All is not as it seems with Edward and the show also introduces Kim Vogel, who has a criminal history and Constantin, a Romanian national who is seen murdering and dismembering a victim at the start of the programme.

Cast
 Tchéky Karyo as Julien Baptiste
 Tom Hollander as Edward Stratton
 Jessica Raine as Genevieve Taylor
 Clare Calbraith as Clare
 Talisa Garcia as Kim Vogel
 Trystan Gravelle as Greg
 Anastasia Hille as Celia Baptiste
 Anna Próchniak as Natalie Rose
 Barbara Sarafian as Martha Horchner
 Alec Secăreanu as Constantin
 Nicholas Woodeson as Peter
  as Niels Horchner
 Fiona Shaw as Emma Chambers (series 2)
 Gabriella Hámori as Kamilla Agoston (series 2)
 Stuart Campbell as Alex Chambers (series 2)
 Conrad Khan as Will Chambers (series 2)
 Dorka Gryllus as Zsófia Arslan (series 2)
 Miklós Béres as Andras Juszt (series 2)

Episodes

Series 1 (2019)

Series 2 (2021)

Production
The BBC announced in April 2018 that a spin-off from its successful The Missing series would go into production and was set to be broadcast in 2019.

Most of the action for the first series was set in Amsterdam in the Netherlands; although some exterior scenes were shot there, some were actually filmed in Antwerp and Ghent in Belgium. Additionally, a handful of scenes were shot in Deal, Kingsdown, Ramsgate and Sandwich, all in Kent, England.

The first series consisted of six episodes, all being broadcast on a Sunday evening.

A second and final series began on BBC One on 18 July 2021.

Reception
Carol Midgley writing in The Times, gave the first episode three out of five and declared the first 45 minutes to be "underwhelming", though the last 15 minutes picked up and left her "semi-intrigued". The Guardian described the programme as a "slowburning spin-off" and "the opener draws you into a darkly compelling plot".

The Daily Telegraph described the first series as "worth sticking with" and gave it three out of five.

Stuart Jeffries of The Guardian gave the second series four out of five.

References

External links

2019 British television series debuts
2021 British television series endings
2010s British crime drama television series
2010s British mystery television series
2020s British crime drama television series
2020s British mystery television series
BBC television dramas
English-language television shows
Murder in television
Television series by All3Media
Television series about missing people
Television shows set in Amsterdam